Devvyn Kyle MacBeth (born November 29, 1980) is an American former soccer player who played as a midfielder, making nine appearances for the United States women's national team.

Career
Hawkins played for the Capital Cougars in high school. In college, she played for the Santa Clara Broncos, helping the team to win the 2001 NCAA Division I Women's Soccer Tournament. She was included in the NCAA All-Tournament Team in 2002, and the same year received Second-Team Athletic All-American Honors. She was also included in the All-West Region third team in 2001 and second team in 2002. Hawkins was included in the All-WCC first team in 1999 and 2002, second team in 2001, and an honorable mention in 2000. She was chosen as the team's Rookie of the Year in 1999, as well as the Player of the Year and Most Inspirational Player in 2002. In total, she scored 21 goals and recorded 20 assists in 93 appearances for the Broncos.

Hawkins was a member of the U.S. under-21 national team. She made her international debut for the United States on March 7, 2001 in a friendly match against Italy. In total, she made nine appearances for the U.S. and scored one goal, earning her final cap on January 29, 2003 in the 2003 Four Nations Tournament against Germany, where she scored the only goal in the 1–0 win.

In club soccer, Hawkins played for the Seattle Sounders Select Women. She later joined the Boston Breakers for the 2003 season, having been selected in the WUSA Draft. She made 15 regular season appearances, scoring 1 goal and recording 2 assists, as well as appearing once in the postseason. She also played for PSV Union Football Club in 2005.

Hawkins later began coaching, having earned her U.S. Soccer "C" license in 2006. She worked as an assistant for the Cabrillo Seahawks, and also coached the Santa Cruz Breakers Academy, Aptos Mariners, and Santa Clara Sporting. In 2007 she worked as an assistant for the Santa Clara Broncos, her alma mater.

Personal life
Hawkins was born in Sitka, Alaska, though she grew up in Olympia, Washington.

Career statistics

International

International goals

References

External links
 Santa Clara player profile
 The Santa Clara interview 

1980 births
Living people
People from Sitka, Alaska
Soccer players from Alaska
Soccer players from Washington (state)
American women's soccer players
American women's soccer coaches
United States women's international soccer players
Women's association football midfielders
Santa Clara Broncos women's soccer players
Seattle Sounders Women players
Boston Breakers (WUSA) players
USL W-League (1995–2015) players
Women's United Soccer Association players